RTL Samstag Nacht was a comedy television show which ran from 6 November 1993 to 23 May 1998 on German TV network RTL. It was the first major comedy show in German television, created after the example of the long-running American show Saturday Night Live and broadcast late on Saturday night. It helped comedy in German television to a breakthrough and was a model for several later comedy shows.

Karl Ranseier was a recurring character featured in fake news reports telling about his death at the end of each episode. The name Karl Ranseier has become a catchphrase in Germany that has led to its own joke category of Ranseiers which are in widespread usage outside of the comedy origin.

External links

German comedy television series
RTL (German TV channel) original programming
1993 German television series debuts
1998 German television series endings
German-language television shows